Chloroclystis stenophrica is a moth in the family Geometridae. It was described by Turner in 1931. It is found in Australia (Queensland).

References

External links

Moths described in 1931
stenophrica